Halim Station is a railway station complex under construction located on Makasar, East Jakarta, Jakarta, Indonesia. The complex is planned to serve Jakarta-Bandung high-speed railway of Kereta Cepat Indonesia–China (KCIC) and Jabodebek LRT Bekasi Line of Kereta Api Indonesia (KAI). The complex consists of two separate elevated stations that would be connected via pedestrian bridge.

The station's name is taken from Halim Perdanakusuma International Airport south of the station, itself is named after the pilot and national hero of Indonesia Halim Perdanakusuma.

Stations

High-speed railway station 
Halim HSR Station is a high-speed railway station located in Jalan Wangko, Halim Perdana Kusuma, Makasar, East Jakarta. The station, which is located at an elevation of +52.212 meters, only serves the upcoming KCIC Jakarta-Bandung route. The station is located on the north side of the complex.

LRT station 

Halim LRT Station is a large class-A type light rail station located in Jalan Halim Perdana Kusuma, Kebon Pala, Makasar, East Jakarta. The station, which is located at an elevation of +28.546 meters, serves the Bekasi Line of the Greater Jakarta LRT (LRT Jabodebek). The station is located on the south side of the complex.

In addition to Jabodebek LRT services, there are also plans to extend the Jakarta LRT Line 1 to this station. The Jakarta LRT station is planned to be in a separate building, namely to the north of Halim HSR Station.

References 

Railway stations in Jakarta
Railway stations scheduled to open in 2023
Proposed rail infrastructure in Indonesia